Tabun-Khara-Obo is an impact crater in the Dornogovi Aimag (province) the south-east of Mongolia.

It has an estimated age of 150 ± 20 million years (Middle Jurassic to Early Cretaceous). The site was first identified as a probable impact crater in the 1960s, although confirmation of the hypothesis only occurred decades later.
Drilling at the site in 2008 revealed rock features consistent with high-speed impacts such as those caused by meteorites.

References

Further reading 
 Amgaa, T., Koelberl, C., Anonymous, Geology and petrography of Tabun Khara Obo Crater (abstract). Meteoritics & Planetary Science, vol. 44, abstract 5019
 Amgaa, T., Koelberl, C., Anonymous, Impact origin of Tabun Khara Obo Crater, Mongolia, confirmed by drill core studies. (Abstract). Geological Society of America, vol. 41, pp. 533. 2009
 McHone, J. F., Dietz, R. S., Tabun Khyara Obo crater, Mongolia: Probably meteoritic. Meteoritics, V. 11, pp. 332–333. 1976
 Shkerin, L. M., Geological structure of the crater-like feature Tabun Khara Obo (south east Mongolia) (in Russian). Meteoritika, v. 35, pp. 97–102. 1976
 Suetenko, O. D., Shkerin, L. M., A proposed meteorite crater in southeastern Mongolia (in Russian). Astronomischeskii Vestnik, v. 4, pp. 261–263. 1970

Impact craters of Mongolia
Jurassic impact craters
Mesozoic Mongolia